This is a record of all seasons played by Palermo F.C. since 1929, including their seasonal performances in all major football competitions when notable.

Key
UC = UEFA Cup.
CI = Coppa Italia.
CIC = Coppa Italia Serie C.
CID = Coppa Italia Serie D.

Seasons

Notes

References
 Pianeta Rosanero
 RSSSF: Sicilian Clubs in Serie A
 RSSSF: Sicilian Clubs in Serie B

Palermo
Seasons